These are the results of the 2005 United Kingdom general election in the city of Edinburgh in Scotland. The 2005 General Election was held on 5 May 2005 and four constituencies returned Labour Party MPs, with one returning a Liberal Democrat MP.

For individual results see results of the 2005 United Kingdom general election.

Overall result

Results in Full

References

Edinburgh
Elections in Edinburgh
2005 in Scotland
2000s elections in Scotland
2000s in Edinburgh